The Casual Courier, Inc. ("TCC") is a corporation with an online forum where people with packages to send can meet casual couriers who are waiting for packages to deliver.

As of early 2014, the web site appears defunct.

Further reading
Wired News

External links
International Association of Air Travel Couriers

Casual Courier, The